Pterocolus is a genus of thief weevils in the beetle order Coleoptera. There are about 16 described species in Pterocolus.

Species
These 16 species belong to the genus Pterocolus:

 Pterocolus amandae Hamilton
 Pterocolus angelae Hamilton
 Pterocolus auricollis Sharp, 1890
 Pterocolus azureus Voss, 1943
 Pterocolus bicolor Hamilton
 Pterocolus crinomucrosus Hamilton
 Pterocolus gravidus Legalov, 2007
 Pterocolus grossus Sharp, 1890
 Pterocolus jennae Hamilton
 Pterocolus minutus Hamilton
 Pterocolus moraguesi Rheinheimer, 2012
 Pterocolus ovatus (Fabricius, 1801) (thief weevil)
 Pterocolus pueblensis Legalov, 2007
 Pterocolus torreyae Hamilton
 Pterocolus truncatus Hamilton
 Pterocolus tuberculatus Hamilton

References

Further reading

 
 

Attelabidae
Articles created by Qbugbot